Maoricicada mangu is a species of cicada that is endemic to New Zealand. This species was first described by Francis Buchanan White in 1879.

Subspecies
There are four subspecies:

 Maoricicada mangu celer Dugdale & Fleming, 1978 – braying cicada
 Maoricicada mangu gourlayi Dugdale & Fleming, 1978 – Dun Mountain cicada
 Maoricicada mangu mangu (White, 1879) – Canterbury scree cicada
 Maoricicada mangu multicostata Dugdale & Fleming, 1978 – northern scree cicada

References

Cicadidae
Cicadas of New Zealand
Insects described in 1879
Endemic fauna of New Zealand
Endemic insects of New Zealand